Salmonid herpesvirus 1 (SalHV-1) is a species of virus in the genus Salmonivirus, family Alloherpesviridae, and order Herpesvirales.

References

External links 
 

Alloherpesviridae